Marina South Pier is a pier that is located in Marina South, Singapore. It is used as a terminal for tourists and day-trippers who are boarding small boats and ferries heading for the Southern Islands. There are regular ferries from the pier to Kusu Island and Saint John's Island.

History
Marina South Pier was first announced in January 2004, to act as a landing point for ship's crews in place of Clifford Pier. The pier commenced operations in April 2006, but due to poor transport connections and lack of development in the vicinity, boat operators at the pier initially fared poorly, while efforts by the Maritime and Port Authority of Singapore to publicise the pier had little effect. Marina South Pier was subsequently officially opened in June 2006, and played host to an open house showcasing careers in the maritime industry to students.

On 22 November 2014, the North-South MRT line was extended to serve Marina South Pier at Marina South Pier MRT station.

Design
Capable of handling up to 3,000 passengers, Marina South Pier comprises a three-storey building with immigration facilities, food establishments, a viewing deck and ticketing booths. It also sports a green glass facade and a wavy roof.

References

External links

Marina South Pier at the Maritime and Port Authority of Singapore website

Marina Bay, Singapore
Piers in Singapore
Straits View